Chrysoesthia boseae is a moth of the family Gelechiidae. It is found on the Canary Islands.

The wingspan is 7–8 mm. The forewings are black with a bright golden fascia. The hindwings are grey.

The larvae feed on Bosea yervamora. They mine the leaves of their host plant. The mine starts as a strongly contorted corridor which is almost completely filled with frass. Later, the mine widens into a full-depth blotch.

References

Moths described in 1908
Chrysoesthia